The PTT Cup is a professional tennis tournament played on hard court. It is currently part of the ATP Challenger Tour. It is held annually in Istanbul, Turkey.

Past finals

Singles

Doubles

External links
Official website
ITF search

 
ATP Challenger Tour
Hard court tennis tournaments
Tennis tournaments in Turkey